Beverage can printing refers to the art and practice of applying an image to a metal beverage can, to advertise its contents.

History
The first beer sold in a can was in 1935, when a brewery in the United States inquired American Can Company about the possibility of packaging their beer in cans. In 1931, American Can Company began to experiment with the possibility of canned beer as they anticipated that the Prohibition period would soon end. The major obstacle in producing beer cans was that no current cans could withstand the excess pressure that was required in packaging beer. Two years later, American Can company successfully designed a coating that would prevent the beer from reacting with the tinplate cans.

Now that they developed a successful beer can, American Can Company had to pitch their innovation to breweries. While large breweries were skeptical of the unproven packaging method, the Gottfried Krueger Brewery took American Can Company's offer of free canning equipment in the event that canned beer was unsuccessful. The test results were extremely successful, and on January 24, 1935 in Richmond, Virginia, the first canned beer hit the public market as "Krueger’s Finest Beer." By the end of 1935, no less than 37 US breweries were producing canned beer.

Felinfoel Brewery Company, located at Llanelli, Wales, became the first brewery outside the United States to sell canned beer, and it was also a success. The package for this beer was called a "conetop". The interest in canned beer suddenly grew so fast that by 1937, 23 breweries were producing 40 brands of canned beer.

World War II temporarily stopped this innovation until 1952. By this point, most breweries were using flat top cans instead. From the 1950s to the 1960s, all beer can were composed from three pieces of metal. Two-piece cans hit the market in 1974. Throughout the years, innovative ideas and development slowly changed the beer can into what it is today. According to Ball Corporation, beer cans weighed 83 grams in 1951, and was then reduced to 38 grams by 1974, to what it is now today at only 21 grams.

Beer cans have been printed with colored photographic images since 1956, "first was famous Scottish and English landmarks and then with pinup girls", called the Lager Lovelies. These cans were popular all over the world. Extensive testing has been done with four color printing on the beers, but every attempt proved unsuccessful.

Coors examined many can coating curing methods and decided to implement an ultraviolet system, which they started to do in 1975. Coors is the only manufacturer to use the UV curing method in the United States. In 1986, they made further innovations to their UV coating lines to increase flexibility and efficiency.

Metal Box Company, a United Kingdom company, developed a method called "Reprotherm" for two-piece cans. In this process, the image to be printed is transferred to the can through a printed medium. Recently, a company called Nacano developed a six color printing method for two-piece cans, "but the first cans to be produced by this process have looked faded and washed out".

UV curing
Prior to the UV curing and coating system, Coors used a conventional production method. The production line is similar, but a four-color offset printer is used and a blanket lays the image onto the can as it spins on a mandrel. The cans are pulled into a gas convention oven by pin chains to cure the inks and varnishes, which take "12 seconds at 400 °F". Afterwards, an internal coating is applied to the cans and it is sent to another gas oven to be cured. Some of the problems using this thermal process of coating and curing includes: Speed of printing limited by length and speed of pin chain conveyors, high energy costs for gas ovens, and also the can coatings becoming non-functional, when they are overheated in the oven due to slow speed or stoppages. Also, the use of lubricants on the pin chains is kept to a minimum to prevent it from getting into the can. Because of this, pin chains "wear excessively and break frequently". Before it can even be repaired, 20 minutes need to be spent to wait for the oven to cool down enough.

UV inks and varnishes contain a "photoinitiator and cure in about 500 milliseconds" when exposure to UV lamps. This method eliminates all three of the problems mentioned above that are found in a conventional process. The time it takes to cure the can is so quick that it is no longer limited by the coating process. Since gas ovens are not used, there are no possibility of the cans being damaged due to overheating. A vacuum system is put in place of the pin chains, which only touches the bottom of the can. This reduces the possibility of damaging the interior of the can.

The application of the UV curing process produced the following results (Center for Materials Fabrication, 1987):
 faster production rates
 high-quality appearance
 less damage to can interior
 less downtime
 less energy use
 no emission
 less floor space needed
 lower capital costs
 less cleanup

While the conventional pin chain and gas oven can operate at up to 1400 cans per minute, the UV curing and vacuum system have the potential to run at much higher speeds, and that will only increase as technology to increase printer and other equipment speed is developed and implemented. The UV varnish coats the beer cans with a strong, abrasion-resistant layer, protecting it in the manufacturing and transportation process. Since there are no longer any pins sticking inside the cans, there is no chance of the interior being scratched or damaged, which can have a negative effect while applying the interior coating. A standard test that measured the interior coating of the UV curing system has "shown a tenfold improvement".

The UV oven "contains 11 modular lamps and reflectors", and the power supply is also modular. This makes it extremely quick to replace specific modules which a problem arises or a lamp burns out.  35 kilowatts of electricity is needed to power the UV lamps. This is the equivalent to the amount of electricity used by just the fans for a conventional gas oven. Coors reduced the amount of energy that they used by over 92% The conventional oven produces gas that needs to be incinerated to minimize emissions. UV ovens, on the only hand, do not emit any fumes or poses and threats to the environment.

While conventional ovens occupy  of floor space, UV ovens only require  . This is a big difference in the amount of required floor space. Due to the fact that the UV curing process requires less space and no incineration, "capital costs are about half that of the thermal cure/pin chain conveying system".

Step by step
 Before any graphics can be put on the can product, disks are cut in aluminium sheet stock and are formed to make the can body and shape. Before it reaches the printer, the can is washed, trimmed and dried thoroughly before an over varnish or ink is applied. Special coating for inside the can is also applied here.
 On the press, four (up to six) different ink rollers supply the colors that will coat the individual printer plates. Printer plates contact a rubberized blanket on a rotating wheel, resulting in a complete negative color image on the blanket. Clean cans are fed into the printer and are placed on a steel mandrel. The spinning mandrel then rotates the can body against the rotating blanket, resulting in the transfer of the final graphic image onto the can body. Other coatings are applied after the ink, and then are sent to the UV ovens.
 Next, the vacuum belts stabilize and support the cans in an optimal geometry for UV light exposure. The ovens operate at about 110 F and contains between six and eight 10-inch, 300 watt/inch, microwave energized mercury lamps. The lights focus maximum illumination on the exterior surface of the aluminum cans, as well as the interior to insure all ink is cured properly. Finally, internal coating is finally applied and dried through a gas fire oven.

Coatings and inks
The coatings on metals tend to fall into two categories: thermoplastic or thermoset. A thermoplastic coating does not chemically react when the substrate undergoes drying after the coating process. The drying of thermoplastic coatings is accomplished by evaporation or by applying heat to fuse the material to the metal. Metals with thermoplastic coatings are not resistant to high heat or aggressive solvents. The coating on the metal can re-melt with exposure to heat or strong solvents from the screen-printing process. A thermoset coating cures by a chemical reaction called polymerization and/or crosslinking. The coating is cured by baking the coated metals at high temperatures for long periods of time. Thermoset coatings tend to be resistant to heat and remelting, and they generally provide excellent solvent and scuff resistance.

Ultraviolet light (UV) curing technology-UV process was motivated by a desire to increase can printing speeds, to reduce energy consumption, and to lower air emissions.

Both solvent based and UV inks are available for decorating coated metals, but solvent-based formulations are the most commonly used. While advances have been made that allow UV inks to perform well on a growing range of metal materials, the chemical properties and curing characteristics of UV inks still limit their functionality compared to solvent-based varieties.

Solvent-based coatings contain solvents at concentrations of approximately 70 to 75 percent by volume (1). The solvent composition is typically a mixture of aliphatic hydrocarbons, aromatics, ethers, cellosolves and acetates. This method produces significant VOC (volatile organic compound) and HAP (hazardous air pollutant) emissions. The coatings have good abrasion resistance and high quality, but the high VOC emissions have virtually eliminated their use in can plants.

Other processes
Ball Corporation has been playing with a new kind of laser technology for brand identity on beverage can tabs. When branding is becoming a more and more evolutionary process, those involved in the business are attempting to find a new way to stand out. The can tabs can come in a variety of colors to best engrave high quality letters, numbers and designs right on the tab.

Ball also has a market on the following printing techniques:
Wet-on-wet process leading to another color and allowing a can to hold several colors while using four to six plates
Fluorescent ink graphics that glow when hit with a black light (not yet perfected)

References

Sources

 "CAN GRAPHICS". Ball Packaging Americas. Ball Packaging Americas, n.d. Web. 16 Feb 2011. https://web.archive.org/web/20110411201428/http://www.ballamericas.com/page.jsp?page=81
 "Government Sues American Can Company". New York Times. New York Times, 30 11 1913. Web. 16 Feb 2011. https://timesmachine.nytimes.com/timesmachine/1913/11/30/100078883.pdf
 "History of the Beverage Can". Ball Packaging – Europe. Ball Packaging, n.d. Web. 16 Feb 2011. https://web.archive.org/web/20110126234904/http://www.ball-europe.com/382_311_ENG_PHP.html
 "IMAGES & LOGOS". Ball Corporation. Ball Corporation, n.d. Web. 16 Feb 2011. https://web.archive.org/web/20101212094745/http://ballcorporate.com/page.jsp?page=44&id=24 [16]
 "Inside a Ball Beverage Can Plant". Ball Packaging Americas. Ball America, n.d. Web. 16 Feb 2011. http://www.ballamericas.com/img/vault/BallMetal-BeverageProcess.pdf
 "Preliminary Industry Characterization: Metal Can Manufacturing--Surface Coating". U. S. Environmental Protection Agency. U. S. Environmental Protection Agency, 09 1998. Web. 16 Feb 2011. http://www.epa.gov/ttn/atw/coat/mcan/pic-can.pdf
 "UV Curing of Coating on Metals." Pollution Protection. Pollution Protection, n.d. Web. 16 Feb 2011. http://www.p2pays.org/ref/26/25750.pdf

Beer vessels and serving
Liquid containers
Packaging